Caldarvan railway station served the estate of Caldarvan, in the historical county of Dunbartonshire, Scotland, from 1856 to 1934 on the Forth and Clyde Junction Railway.

History 
The station was opened as Kilmaronock on 26 May 1856 by the Forth and Clyde Junction Railway. To the south of the platform was a goods siding. To the northeast was the signal box and Gallangad Siding. The station's name was changed to Caldarvan in January 1877. It closed on 1 October 1934.

References 

Disused railway stations in West Dunbartonshire
Railway stations in Great Britain opened in 1856
Railway stations in Great Britain closed in 1934
1856 establishments in Scotland
1934 disestablishments in Scotland